Glenview Park Secondary School is a high school in Cambridge, Ontario, Canada, for students in South Galt. The school was opened in 1957. It is also one of the two International Baccalaureate (IB) Schools in Waterloo Region.

Sports teams
Glenview is known as the Panthers when playing sports, representing the colours of Black, White & Red. However they are sometimes referred to as Glenview Panthers or Glenview, especially when against Preston High School who are also known as the Panthers.

Notable alumni
Rob Ducey, major league baseball player
Scott Walker; played in the NHL
The Reklaws, country music sibling duo Stuart and Jenna Walker
Michael Martchenko, illustrator

See also
List of high schools in Ontario

References

External links
 Glenview Park Secondary School homepage

Waterloo Region District School Board
Educational institutions established in 1957
High schools in the Regional Municipality of Waterloo
1957 establishments in Ontario